Boiga hoeseli, also known as the Lesser Sundas cat snake, is a species of snake of the family Colubridae.

Geographic range
The snake is found in the Lesser Sunda Islands of Indonesia.

References 

hoeseli
Snakes of Southeast Asia
Reptiles of Indonesia
Endemic fauna of Indonesia
Reptiles described in 2010
Fauna of the Lesser Sunda Islands